Spectamen martensi is a species of sea snail, a marine gastropod mollusk, in the family Solariellidae.

Distribution
This species occurs in the following locations:
 Eastern Cape, Province of the
 KwaZulu-Natal

References

Solariellidae